Adler is a surname of German origin meaning eagle. and has a frequency in the United Kingdom of less than 0.004%, and of 0.008% in the United States.
In Christian iconography, the eagle is the symbol of John the Evangelist, and as such a stylized eagle was commonly used as a house sign/totem in German speaking areas. From the tenement the term easily moved to its inhabitants, particularly to those having only one name. This phenomenon can be easily seen in German and Austrian censuses from the 16th and 17th centuries.

Notable Adlers

Actors, writers and producers 
 Alfred Adler (1870–1937), Austrian doctor and psychotherapist 
 Allen Adler (1916–1964), American writer
 Bill Adler (born 1951), American music journalist
 Bruce Adler (1944–2008), American actor
 Celia Adler (1891–1979), American Jewish actress
 Charles Adler (broadcaster) (born 1954), Canadian broadcaster
 Charlie Adler (born 1956), American voice actor
 Cyrus Adler (1863–1940), American educator
 David A. Adler (born 1947), Writer of children's books
Elizabeth Adler (born 1950), British author
 Friedrich Adler (writer) (1857–1938), Czech-Austrian politician
 H. G. Adler (1910–1988), German Jewish poet and novelist.
 Jacob Pavlovich Adler (1855–1926), born Yankev P. Adler, Ukrainian-born Jewish actor and a star in Yiddish theater
 Jay Adler (1896–1978), American actor in theater, television, and film
 Jerry Adler (born 1929), American theatre director, production supervisor and television and film actor
 Julius Ochs Adler (1892–1955), American publisher, journalist, and United States Army General
 Jussi Adler-Olsen (born 1950), Danish writer 
 Lou Adler (journalist) (1929–2017), American broadcaster
 Lou Adler (1933–), American record producer, manager, and director
 Luther Adler (1903–1984), American actor and director on Broadway
 Margot Adler, (1946–2014), author, journalist, Wiccan Priestess and Elder, NPR correspondent in New York City
 Maurice Adler (1909–1960), American film producer and 20th Century Fox production head
 Max Adler (actor) (born 1986), American actor
 Mortimer J. Adler (1902–2001), American Aristotelian philosopher, author, and educator
 Renata Adler (born 1938), American journalist and writer
 Sara Adler (1858–1953), Ukrainian Jewish actress in Yiddish theater
 Sonya Adler or Sonya Oberlander (died 1886), one of the first women to perform in Yiddish theater in Imperial Russia
 Stella Adler (1901–1992), Jewish-American actress and acting teacher
 Warren Adler (1927–2019), American writer
 Sarah Adler (born 1978), French actress

Engineers and scientists 
 Ada Adler (1878–1946), Danish classical scholar
August Adler (1863–1923), Austrian mathematician
 Charles Adler Jr. (1899–1980), American inventor
 Darin Adler, software architect
 David Adler (1935–1987), American physicist
 Edda Adler (born 1937), Argentine chemist and biologist
 George J. Adler, a noted philologist, linguist and author of A Practical Grammar of the Latin Language
 Howard I. Adler, biologist, founder of Oxyrase Inc.
 Irving Adler (1913–2012) author, mathematician, scientist, political activist and educator
 Johan Gunder Adler (1784–1852), Danish civil servant and a co-author of the Constitution of Norway
 Mark Adler, Mars Exploration Rover mission manager, co-author of zlib, inventor of Adler-32 checksum
 Nancy Adler, American health psychologist
 Niclas Adler, (born 1971), Swedish organizational theorist
 Robert Adler (1913–2007), inventor of the remote control
 Saul Adler (1895–1966), British-Israeli expert on parasitology
 Stephen L. Adler (born 1939), American physicist
 Jonathan Adler (born 1988), Israeli Engineer

Musicians 
 Chris Adler (born 1972), drummer of the metal band "Lamb of God"
 Cisco Adler, the artist featured in all songs of the artist Shwayze
 Guido Adler (1855–1941), Bohemian-Austrian musicologist and writer on music
 Hans G. Adler (1904–1979), South African pianist, musicologist, and antique keyboard instrument collector
 Henry Adler, American drum kit educator, player and actor
 Hugo Chaim Adler (1896–1955), Belgian composer, cantor, and choir conductor
 James Adler (born 1950), Composer and pianist from Chicago, Illinois
 Julia Rebekka Adler (born 1978), German violist.
 Larry Adler (1914–2001), American musician, widely acknowledged as one of the world's most skilled harmonica players
 Oskar Adler (1875–1955), Austrian violinist, physician and esoteric savant, brother of Max Adler.
 Richard Adler (1921–2012), Jewish-American lyricist, composer and producer of several Broadway shows
 Samuel Adler (born 1928), Jewish-American composer and conductor
 Steven Adler (born 1965), a drummer for the hard rock band Guns N' Roses
 Vincent Adler, Hungarian pianist, composer
 Willie Adler (born 1976), guitarist of the metal band Lamb of God

Conductors 
 Frederick Charles Adler (1889–1959), London-born conductor known as "F. Charles Adler"
 Kurt Adler (1907–1977), Austrian-American conductor, Metropolitan Opera Chorus Master(1943–1973)
 Kurt Herbert Adler (1905–1988), Vienna-born American conductor, San Francisco Opera general director (1953–1981)
 Peter Herman Adler (1899–1990), Czech-born American conductor, director of NBC Opera Theatre (1950–1964)

Politicians 
 Charles S. Adler (1862–1911), American politician from New York
 Ernie Adler (born 1950), American politician from Nevada
 Friedrich Adler (1879–1960), Austrian revolutionary politician, son of Viktor Adler
 John Adler (1959–2011), American politician from New Jersey
 Julius Adler (1894–1945), German politician
 Steve Adler (born 1956), American politician,  mayor of Austin, Texas
 Victor Adler (1852–1918), Austrian Social Democratic leader

Rabbis and theologians 
 Felix Adler (professor) (1851–1933), leader of ethical humanism
 Hermann Adler (1839–1911), Orthodox Chief Rabbi of the British Empire, 1891–1911
 Johann Kaspar Adler (1488–1560), also Kaspar Aquila or Caspari Aquilae, German reformer
 Michael Adler (1868–1944), first Jewish chaplain to the British Army
 Nathan Adler (1741–1800), German kabalist
 Nathan Marcus Adler (–1891), Orthodox Chief Rabbi of the British Empire, 1845–1891
 Samuel Adler (rabbi) (1809–1891), Reform rabbi

Athletes 
 Anders Adler (born 1982), Swedish ice hockey player
 Daniel Adler (sailor) (born 1958), Brazilian sailor
 Jens Adler (born 1965), German football player
 Kim Adler, American bowler
 Nicky Adler (born 1985), German football player
 Nikki Adler (born 1987), German boxer
 Oliver Adler (born 1967), German football player
 René Adler (born 1985), German football player
 Thomas Adler (born 1965), German football player

Others 
 Alfred Adler (1870–1937), Austrian psychologist, founder of the school of individual psychology
 Coleman Adler (1868–1938), Jeweler and founder of Adler's Jewelry in New Orleans in 1898
 Dankmar Adler (1844–1900), German-born American architect
 David B. Adler (1826–1878), Jewish-Danish banker
 Freda Adler (born 1934), criminologist
 Friedrich Adler (architect) (1827–1908), German architect and archaeologist
 Friedrich Adler (artist) (1878–1942), German artist and designer, murdered in the Holocaust
 Hans Hermann Adler (1891–1956), German professor of journalism at the University of Heidelberg
 Jacob O. Adler (1913–1999), Professor of Economics and Business at the University of Hawaii
 Jankel Adler (1895–1949), Polish painter and printmaker
 Jonathan Adler (born 1966), American potter, designer, and author
 Jonathan H. Adler (born 1969), Professor of Law at Case Western University School of Law
 Karl-Heinz Adler (1927–2018), German artist
 Matthew Adler (born 1962), American law professor
 Max Adler (Sears) (1866–1952), American businessman and philanthropist
 Max Adler (Marxist) (1873–1937), Austrian social theorist, brother of Oskar Adler.
 Rodney Adler, (born 1959),  Australian businessman and white collar criminal
 Ruth Adler (1944–1994), feminist, human rights campaigner and child welfare advocate
 Salomon Adler (1630–1709), German painter of the Baroque period
 Solomon Adler (1909–1994), Soviet spy who supplied information to the Silvermaster espionage ring
 Valerie Adler, South African artist
 Katya Adler, British German journalist

Fictional characters 
 Adler von Berg, a Luftwaffe pilot-turned-adventurer, of the Belgian comics series Adler by René Sterne
 Grace Adler, female lead in the TV series Will and Grace
 Henry Adler, main character in David Wellington's film I Love a Man in Uniform
 Irene Adler, fictional character featured in the Sherlock Holmes story "A Scandal in Bohemia" by Arthur Conan Doyle.
Judith Adler, fictional character in The Case of the Toxic Spell Dump by Harry Turtledove.
Klaus Adler, would-be Führer of the Moon Nazis in the movie Iron Sky (2012).
Rafe Adler, the main antagonist of Uncharted 4: A Thief's End.
Russell Adler, a character of Call of Duty: Black Ops Cold War by Treyarch.
Sadie Adler, character in Red Dead Redemption 2.
Samantha Adler, arms dealer in the novel series Son Altesse Sérénissime
 Scott Adler, a fictional character featured in the Tom Clancy Jack Ryan universe novels.  Adler is a career U.S. Department of State employee who rises throughout the series, eventually becoming Secretary of State.
 Vincent Adler, antagonist behind the first two seasons of White Collar
 Wilhelm Adler, main character in Saul Bellow's novella Seize the Day
 John Adler, main character in Mary Burton's novel Her Last Word

References 

Jewish surnames
German-language surnames
Yiddish-language surnames
Surnames from nicknames